The Rud Aero RA-2 is an American, all carbon fiber, unlimited aerobatic aircraft built by Rud Aero in the Experimental-Exhibition category.

Design and development
The RA-2 is a single engine, tandem seat, low-wing, conventional landing gear equipped aircraft, made out of carbon fiber. It uses a constant chord symmetrical airfoil. It has interchangeable aerobatic and cross-country wings.

Variants
RA-2
Base model
RA-2T Trainer
Training model
RA-3
Two-seat trainer model

Specifications (RA-2)

References

External links

First Flight video on Youtube

Homebuilt aircraft
Aerobatic aircraft